The Men's 100m Freestyle event at the 2007 Pan American Games occurred at the Maria Lenk Aquatic Park in Rio de Janeiro, Brazil on July 16 (evening; prelims), July 17 (morning; semifinals) and July 18 (evening; finals). A total of 20 swimmer were entered in the event.

Medalists

Records

Results

Notes

References
 Official Site
 Official Results

Freestyle, Men's 100m